Guinea-Bissau Sign Language is an incipient sign language evolving from the single school for the deaf in Guinea-Bissau, which was founded in Bissau in 2003. In 2005 a linguist and Portuguese Sign Language teacher found GBSL to still be basic, but with some consistency among students in the school and village use when the students went home.

References

Sign language development in Guinea Bissau, NDCS, 2006.

Sign language isolates
Languages of Guinea-Bissau